Ayodhya Mayoral Constituency is one of the 16 mayoral constituencies of Uttar Pradesh, which was formed in year 2017.

Total Number of Voters

List of Mayors
Key

Election Results

References
 
 

 
A